This is a list of major music awards and nominations received by Nigerian singer Davido.

Soul Train Awards

!Ref
|-
|2014
|Davido for "Aye" 
|Best International Performance 
|
|

The Future Africa Awards

!Ref
|-
|2014
|Himself
|African Young Person of the Year
|
|

Kora Awards

!Ref
|-
|2012
|Himself
|Best Newcomer Award
|
|

BET Awards

!Ref
|-
|2014
|Himself
|Best International Act: Africa
|
|

Ben TV Awards

!Ref
|-
|rowspan="4"|2014
|Himself
|Best Male Artist
|
|rowspan="3"|
|-
|"Daddy" (Reminisce featuring Davido)
|Best Collaboration
|
|-
|"Number One" Remix (Diamond Platnumz featuring Davido)
|Best International Collaboration
|
|-
|"Aye"
|Music Video of the Year
|
|

Dynamix All Youth Awards

!Ref
|-
|rowspan="2"|2011
|Himself
|Promising Youth Artiste
|
|rowspan="2"|
|-
|"Back When"
|Song of the Year
|

MOBO Awards

!Ref
|-
|2014
|Himself
|Best African Act
|
|

MTV Europe Music Awards

!Ref
|-
|2014
|Himself
|Best African Act
|
|

African Muzik Magazine Awards

!Ref
|-
|rowspan="6"|2014
|rowspan="2"|Himself
|Best Male West Africa
|
|rowspan="2"|
|-
|Artist of the Year
|
|-
|rowspan="2"|"Skelewu"
|Song of the Year
|
|rowspan="4"|
|-
|Best Dance in a Video
|
|-
|rowspan="2"|"Number One Remix"
|Song of the Year
|
|-
|Best Collabo
|
|}

MTV Africa Music Awards

!Ref
|-
|rowspan="4"|2014
|rowspan="2"|Himself
|Best Male
|rowspan="2" 
|rowspan="2"|
|-
|Artist of the Year
|-
|"Number One" (Remix) (Diamond featuring Davido)
|Best Collaboration
|rowspan="2" 
|rowspan="2"|
|-
|"Skelewu"
|Song of the Year

World Music Awards

!Ref
|-
|rowspan="3"|2014
|rowspan="3"|Himself
|World's Best Male Artist
|
|rowspan="3"|
|-
|World's Best Live Act
|
|-
|World's Best Entertainer Of The Year
|

Channel O Music Video Awards 

!Ref
|-
|rowspan="5"|2014
|rowspan="4"|"Aye"
|Most Gifted Male
|
|rowspan="5"|
|-
|Most Gifted Afropop
|
|-
|Most Gifted West
|
|-
|Most Gifted Video
|
|-
|"Skelewu"
|Most Gifted Dance
|
|-
|2013
|"Gobe"
|Most Gifted Afro Pop Video
|
|
|-
|rowspan="2"|2012
|rowspan="2"|"Dami Duro"
|Most Gifted Dance Video of the Year
|
||
|-
|Most Gifted Newcomer Video of the Year
|
||

Nigeria Music Video Awards (NMVA)

!Ref
|-
|rowspan="5"|2014
|rowspan="4"|"Aye"
|Video of the Year
|
|rowspan="5"|
|-
|Indigenous Concept
|
|-
|Best Use Of Costumes
|
|-
|Best Afro Pop Video
|
|-
|"Tchelete (Goodlife)" (featuring Mafikizolo)
|Best Pop Extra Video
|
|-
|rowspan="2"|2013
|"All of You"
|Best Dance Hall/Reggae Video
|
|rowspan="2"|
|-
|"Gobe"
|Best Pop Extra Video
|
|-
||2012
|"Dami Duro"
|Best Video By A New Artiste(Live Beats Choice)
|
|

4Syte TV Music Video Awards

!Ref
|-
|2014
|"Aye"
|Best African Video
|
|
|-
|2013
|"Gobe"
|rowspan="2"|Best African Act Video
|
|
|-
|2012
|"Dami Duro osezy"
|
|

Ghana Music Awards

!Ref
|-
|2014
|rowspan="2"|Himself
|rowspan="2"|African Artiste Of The Year
|
|
|-
|2013
|
|

City People Entertainment Awards

!Ref
|-
|rowspan="4"|2014
|Himself
|Musician Of The Year (Male)
|
|
|-
|rowspan="2"|"Aye"
|Most Popular Song of the Year
|
|rowspan="3"|
|-
|Video of the Year
|
|-
|"Daddy" (Reminisce featuring Davido)
|Best Collabo of the Year
|
|-
|rowspan="3"|2013
|rowspan="2"|Himself
|Musician of the Year (Male)
|
|rowspan="3"|
|-
|Best Hip-Hop Artiste of the Year
|
|-
|"Gobe"
|Most Popular Song of the Year
|

The Headies

!Ref
|-
|rowspan="5"|2018
|Himself
|Artiste of the Year
|
|rowspan="5"|
|-
|rowspan="3"|"If"
|Song of the Year
|
|-
|Best Pop Single
|
|-
|Headies Viewer's Choice
|
|-
|"Like Dat"
|Best Music Video
|
|-
|rowspan="3"|2014
|Himself
|Artiste of the Year
|
|rowspan="3"|
|-
|rowspan="2"|"Aye"
|Song of the Year
|
|-
|Best Pop Single
|
|-
|rowspan="5"|2013
|rowspan="2"|Himself
|Artiste of the Year
|
|
|-
|Hip Hop World Revelation
|
|rowspan="2"|
|-
|rowspan="2"|"Omo Baba Olowo"
|Best R&B/Pop Album
|
|-
|Album of the Year
|
|rowspan="2"|
|-
|"Gobe"
|Best Pop Single
|
 
|-
|rowspan="4"|2012
|Himself
|Next Rated
|
|
|-
|rowspan="2"|"Dami Duro"
|Best Pop Single
|
|rowspan="3"|
|-
|Song of the Year
|
|-
|"Carolina" (Sauce Kid featuring Davido)
|Best Collabo
|
|-
|rowspan="4"|2022
|rowspan="3"|Himself 
|Best Male Artist
|
|rowspan="4"|
|-
|African Artist of the Year
|
|-
|Humanitarian Award of the Year 
|
|-
|A Better Time
|Best Afrobeats Album
|

Nigeria Entertainment Awards

!Ref
|-
|rowspan="5"|2014
|"Aye"
|Hottest Single of the Year
|
|rowspan="2"|
|-
|Himself
|Male Artist of the Year
|
|-
|"Skelewu"
|Best Music Video of the Year (Artist & Director)
|
|
|-
|"Gallardo" (RunTown featuring Davido)
|rowspan="2"|Best Collaboration
|
|
|-
|"Mofe Lowo Ju Daddy Mi" (Reminisce featuring Davido)
|
|
|-
|rowspan="2"|2013
|O.B.O (Omo Baba Olowo)
|Best Album of the Year
|
||
|-
|Himself
|Best Pop/R&B Artiste of the Year
|
||
|-
|rowspan="3"|2012
|"Dami Duro"
|Hottest Single of the Year
|
|rowspan="3"|
|-
|Himself
|Best New Act of the Year
|
|-
|"Carolina" (Sauce Kid featuring Davido)
|Best Collabo of the Year
|

Nickelodeon Kids' Choice Awards

!Ref
|-
|2018
|Davido
|Favorite African Star
|
|

AFRIMA

Net Honours

References

Davido